Maurice Willmore Barley M.A., F.S.A., F.R.Hist.S., (19 August 1909 – 23 June 1991) was an English historian and archaeologist, specialising in medieval settlements and historic buildings.

Barley was born and raised in Lincoln; his father was a prominent member of the Workers' Educational Association. Barley studied history at Reading, taking a Dip. Ed in 1932. Here he met his future wife, Diana. Barley taught at a school in Grimsby, then went to work at University College, Hull in the Department of Local History. At this time he also taught local history and archaeology at adult education classes in Lindsey and East Yorkshire. Following contact with the eminent folklorist Ethel Rudkin, Barley's interest in local history intensified; his publications on the subject cover slate headstones, varieties of apple, architecture and archaeology.

During the Second World War, Barley worked for the Ministry of Information and lived in Oxfordshire. In 1946, he joined the Extra-Mural Department of the University of Nottingham, and lived at the Old Hall at North Muskham. He was Organising Tutor of the University College in Rural Nottinghamshire until 1962, in which year he became Senior Lecturer in the Department of Classics, and Reader in Archaeology in 1965. He was appointed Nottingham's first professor of Archaeology in 1971. Barley organised major excavations of the Roman fort and town at Great Casterton, Rutland, and the medieval borough at Torksey, alongside minor excavations in Nottingham and Newark. At Nottingham, he developed his interest in medieval and vernacular architecture, and read for an M.A. in the subject in 1952. He published many articles on buildings, publishing his most important book, The English Farmhouse and Cottage, in 1961. Also noteworthy was his publication A Guide to British Topographical Collections of 1974. From 1951 Barley had been actively involved in the development of the Council for British Archaeology, as a member of the Executive Committee, then as Secretary (from 1954–64). In 1966 he was appointed to the Royal Commission on the Ancient and Historical Monuments and Constructions of England. Between 1957 and 1963 he was President of the Vernacular Architecture Group and between 1972 and 1990 Chairman of the York Archaeological Trust. He was also a Vice-President of the Society of Antiquaries of London and a fellow of the Royal Historical Society.

Barley retired from the university in 1974, but remained academically active, being prominent in local and national heritage bodies and trusts, and campaigning on conservation issues. Having suffered serious illness for some years, Barley nonetheless remained correcting proofs and preparing his autobiography for publication until just before his death.

Barley's most valuable contribution to folklore is his seminal work on Plough Monday folk plays; from the 1930s through to the 1950s, he collected material, partly from or through members of his evening classes, with some work conducted for local periodicals and the BBC. Barley's research material on the Plough Monday plays, along with other papers relating to his archaeological work, is held in the archives of the University of Nottingham in its manuscripts and special collections. Historic England hold a collection of Barley’s photographs and, photographs attributed to him are also held in the Conway Library, whose archive, of primarily architectural images, is in the process of being digitised as part of the wider Courtauld Connects project.

Selected publications 

 Archaeological papers from York presented to M.W. Barley, eds. P.V. Addyman and V.E. Black. York : York Archaeological Trust, 1984, 
 Recording Timber-Framed Buildings: An Illustrated Glossary, N W Alcock, M W Barley, P W Dixon & R A Meeson, Council for British Archaeology, 2nd edition 1989 (reprinted 2018), 
 The English Farmhouse and Cottage, Gloucester : Sutton, 1987 (first published in 1961), 0862993717 
 The Shell Book of English Villages, ed. John Hadfield with entries by M. W. Barley, London : Peerage, 1985,  
 European Towns: their archaeology and early history, editor & contributor, London : Council for British Archaeology, 1977, 
 The Plans and Topography of Medieval Towns in England and Wales, London : Council for British Archaeology, 1975, 
 A Guide to British Topographical Collections, London : Council for British Archaeology, 1974, 
 The House & Home, London : Vista Books, 1963
 The Face of Britain: Lincolnshire and The Fens, B. T. Batsford, London, 1952

References

External links
 
 

1909 births
1991 deaths
British archaeologists
Alumni of the University of Nottingham
20th-century archaeologists